Jasmine Sailing is an author, events organizer, performer, music journalist, and editor-publisher of the magazine CyberPsychos AOD.  She also organized the Death Equinox conventions in Denver, Colorado, where she resides. She debuted the CPAOD Books book line in 1995.

In the 1990s she performed in multiple music bands (as a synthesist and sometimes vocalist), including Futura Ultima Erotica, Goon Patrol, Ludicrous, and YHVH.

She was raised in the mountains of Colorado.

Sailing has been a guest at Readercon and World Horror Convention.

After running Death Equinox 2001 and publishing various books and another Cyber-Psychos AOD, Sailing put her regular projects on hiatus. She had serious health problems from untreated Graves' disease and Multiple sclerosis. She then recuperated while working on more simple projects. One of them was a Pair Go tournament called Te wo Tsunaide. It was the first Pair Go tournament in the United States outside of the US Go Congress, and during the first year she had support and guidance from Korean professional player and Go book author Janice Kim.

Publication history 

The publications in which Sailing's works have appeared include:

 The Mammoth Book of Historical Erotica 
 What the Fuck: the Avant-Porn Anthology
 Morbid Curiosity
 Q Zine – Puck
 Mind Rot
 Collective Cauldron
 Bare Bone
 Bloodsongs
 Rebel Yell

References

External links 
Jasmine Sailing's Ode to God
CPAOD Home Page
Bio

American erotica writers
American book editors
American magazine editors
Women magazine editors
Living people
Writers from Denver
1971 births